The 2017 Japan Golf Tour season was played from 19 January to 3 December. The season consisted of 26 official money events, mostly in Japan, as well as the four majors. One event will be played in Singapore, and one in Myanmar, both co-sanctioned by the Asian Tour.

Schedule
The following table lists official events during the 2017 season.

Unofficial events
The following events were sanctioned by the Japan Golf Tour, but did not carry official money, nor were wins official.

Money list
The money list was based on prize money won during the season, calculated in Japanese yen.

Notes

References

External links

Japan Golf Tour
Japan Golf Tour
Golf Tour